Nape Moses Nnauye is a Tanzanian politician presently serving as the Chama Cha Mapinduzi's  Member of Parliament and for Mtama constituency since November 2015.

He was elected as a Member of Parliament for Mtama constituency in the October 2015 general election and was thereafter appointed by President John Magufuli as the Minister of Information, Culture, Artists and Sports in December 2015. He was relieved of his duty in a mini cabinet reshuffle by the president on 23 March 2017 and was replaced by Harrison Mwakyembe. In January 2022, he was appointed Minister for information, communications and information technology.

References

Living people
Tanzanian MPs 2015–2020
Tanzanian MPs 2020–2025
21st-century Tanzanian politicians
Chama Cha Mapinduzi politicians
Bangalore University alumni
Mzumbe University alumni
Year of birth missing (living people)